Kuślin  is a village in Nowy Tomyśl County, Greater Poland Voivodeship, in west-central Poland. It is the seat of the gmina (administrative district) called Gmina Kuślin.

References

Villages in Nowy Tomyśl County